Georges Carcagne (7 January 1908 – 18 July 1990) was a French boxer. He competed in the men's lightweight event at the 1928 Summer Olympics.

References

1908 births
1990 deaths
French male boxers
Olympic boxers of France
Boxers at the 1928 Summer Olympics
Place of birth missing
Lightweight boxers